Viktor Nikolayevich Kozlov (born 14 February 1975) is a Russian former professional ice hockey center and coach. He is the current head coach of the Kontinental Hockey League's Salavat Yulaev Ufa.

Playing career
Kozlov was drafted by the San Jose Sharks in the first round as the sixth overall selection in the 1993 NHL Entry Draft. Kozlov scored his first career goal for the Sharks against Ed Belfour and the Chicago Blackhawks on 21 March 1995 in a 7–3 Sharks loss. He would play a few seasons in San Jose before being traded to the Florida Panthers on 13 November 1997. It would be in Florida, playing with Pavel Bure, that Kozlov would have his best years. His best season was during the 1999–2000 season when he set career highs in assists and points. He played with the Panthers until 1 March 2004, when he was traded to the New Jersey Devils for Christian Berglund and Victor Uchevatov.

During the NHL lockout that wiped out the 2004–05 NHL season, Kozlov played for Lada Togliatti in the Russian Superleague (RSL). However, he returned to the Devils when the NHL started up again.

Kozlov was signed as a free agent by the New York Islanders in 2006. On December 3, 2006, he recorded his second career hat trick and first career four-goal game. Despite a hat trick of his own by Brendan Shanahan, the Islanders defeated rival New York Rangers 7–4 at Madison Square Garden.  The four goals gave him a total of six in a 24-hour period — he had scored twice the previous night in Pittsburgh against the Penguins.

On 1 July 2007, Kozlov signed a two-year contract with the Washington Capitals.  On 15 April 2009, after 15 NHL seasons Kozlov scored his first playoff goal as a member of the Capitals.

On 9 June 2009, Salavat Yulaev Ufa signed Kozlov to a three-year contract, signifying the end of his successful NHL career. In each season with Salavat, Kozlov helped the club qualify for the post-season and was part of the leadership group, Captaining for one year.

Kozlov opted to sign as a free agent on a two-year contract with Lokomotiv Yaroslavl from the 2012–13 season. In scoring just 1 goal in 21 games, Kozlov was traded to fellow KHL club, HC CSKA Moscow on January 9, 2013. Plagued by injury throughout his tenure with CSKA, Kozlov missed the entire 2013–14 campaign.

On June 19, 2014, Kozlov signalled a return to health in signing a one-year contract to provide a veteran presence with Avtomobilist Yekaterinburg.

In September 2015, Kozlov retired from playing hockey, instead joining Metallurg Magnitogorsk as their assistant coach on October 19, 2015.

Career statistics

Regular season and playoffs

International

References

 2005 NHL Official Guide & Record Book

External links

1975 births
Avtomobilist Yekaterinburg players
Florida Panthers players
HC CSKA Moscow players
HC Dynamo Moscow players
HC Lada Togliatti players
Ice hockey players at the 2006 Winter Olympics
Ice hockey players at the 2010 Winter Olympics
Kansas City Blades players
Living people
Lokomotiv Yaroslavl players
National Hockey League All-Stars
National Hockey League first-round draft picks
New Jersey Devils players
New York Islanders players
Olympic ice hockey players of Russia
Sportspeople from Tolyatti
Russian ice hockey centres
Salavat Yulaev Ufa players
San Jose Sharks draft picks
San Jose Sharks players
Washington Capitals players
Soviet ice hockey centres
Expatriate ice hockey players in the United States
Russian expatriate sportspeople in the United States
Russian expatriate ice hockey people